Scythris ellipsiella is a moth of the family Scythrididae. It was described by Bengt Å. Bengtsson in 2014. It is found in Namibia, South Africa (Gauteng) and Zimbabwe.

References

ellipsiella
Moths described in 2014